Emel Sığırcı (born 24 October 1992 in Ayvalık, Turkey) is a Turkish basketball player. She currently plays for the Turkish professional basketball club İzmit Belediyespor.

See also
 Turkish women in sports

External links
Player Profile at fenerbahce.org
Player Profile at fibaeurope.com

1992 births
Living people
Turkish women's basketball players
Fenerbahçe women's basketball players
Centers (basketball)
Power forwards (basketball)
People from Ayvalık